Prodigal Son is an American procedural drama television series created by Chris Fedak and Sam Sklaver for the Fox Broadcasting Company that premiered on September 23, 2019 and concluded on May 18, 2021. In October 2019, the series was picked up for a full season. In May 2020, the series was renewed for a second season which premiered on January 12, 2021. In May 2021, the series was canceled after two seasons.

Premise
The series centers on Malcolm Bright whose father Martin Whitly is an infamous serial killer known as "the Surgeon". When Malcolm was a child, he discovered what his father was doing and alerted the police who were able to finally catch him. Malcolm has not seen his father for ten years due to cutting ties and changing his name in order to distance himself from Martin. Having become an FBI profiler, and now working for the NYPD, Malcolm is forced to confront his father after a copycat serial killer emerges. He must use Whitly's insights to help solve horrible crimes while handling inner battles. He must also deal with his father, who is constantly trying to insert himself back into Malcolm's life. Along the way he is helped by Gil, an NYPD lieutenant and Malcom's father figure, who was the officer who responded to Malcolm's call all those years ago.

Cast

Main
 Tom Payne as Malcolm Bright (né Whitly), a disgraced former FBI profiler who now works for the NYPD. He possesses the unique ability to view crimes from the perspective of the killer, allowing him to pick up on things that other cops might miss. However, this gift also haunts him, causing him to live in a perpetual state of fear that he will one day succumb to the same sociopathic tendencies as his father.
Kasjan Wilson as young Malcolm
 Lou Diamond Phillips as Gil Arroyo, a lieutenant with Major Crimes in the NYPD. He was the arresting officer of Martin Whitly and, since then, has acted as a surrogate father to his son, Malcolm; Gil hires Malcolm as his new consultant after the latter is fired from the FBI.
 Halston Sage as Ainsley Whitly, Malcolm's ambitious younger sister; a TV news reporter.
 Aurora Perrineau as Dani Powell, a detective under Arroyo's command who is sympathetic to Malcolm's personal issues
 Frank Harts as JT Tarmel, a detective under Arroyo's command
 Keiko Agena as Edrisa Tanaka, an NYC medical examiner with an interest in Malcolm
 Bellamy Young as Jessica Whitly (née Milton), Malcolm's mother and a successful businesswoman from an old money high society family, who suffers from alcoholism as a result of her drinking to cope with her husband's crimes
 Michael Sheen as Martin Whitly, Malcolm's father who is currently incarcerated in an asylum after committing 23 murders as "the Surgeon"

Recurring

 Esau Pritchett as Mr. David, a worker at the Claremont Psychiatric Hospital who is in charge of Dr. Whitly
 Charlayne Woodard as Gabrielle Le Deux (season 1), Malcolm's psychologist since his father's arrest
 Molly Griggs as Eve Blanchard (season 1), Malcolm's deceased girlfriend, a lawyer who has an interest in fighting human trafficking
 Dermot Mulroney as Nicholas Endicott (season 1), a pharmaceutical tycoon who has a secret association with Dr. Whitly
 Armando Acevedo as Hector
 Alan Gary as Burt
 Christian Borle as Friar Pete (season 2), a new patient at the Claremont Psychiatric Hospital
 Catherine Zeta-Jones as Vivian Capshaw (season 2), a resident medical doctor at the Claremont Psychiatric Hospital

Production

Development 
On January 28, 2019, it was announced that Fox had given the production a pilot order. The pilot was written by Chris Fedak and Sam Sklaver, who executive produces alongside Lee Toland Krieger, Greg Berlanti and Sarah Schechter. Production companies involved with the pilot include Berlanti Productions and Warner Bros. Television. On March 12, 2019, it was announced that Lee Toland Krieger would be directing the series. On May 9, 2019, it was announced that the production had been given a series order. The following day, it was announced that the series would premiere in the Fall of 2019. The series debuted on September 23, 2019. On October 7, 2019, the series was picked up for a full season of 22 episodes. In March 2020, Warner Bros. Television suspended production on the series upon the outbreak of the COVID-19 pandemic. As a result, episode 20 served as the first season finale.

On May 21, 2020, Fox renewed the series for a second season which premiered on January 12, 2021. On May 10, 2021, Fox canceled the series after two seasons.

Casting 
In February 2019, it was announced that Lou Diamond Phillips, Aurora Perrineau and Frank Harts had been cast in the pilot's lead roles. Alongside the pilot's order announcement, in March 2019, it was reported that Michael Sheen, Bellamy Young, Finn Jones, Keiko Agena and Halston Sage had joined the cast. Four days later, on March 12, 2019, it was announced that Tom Payne would replace Jones in the starring  role of Malcolm Bright, during first table readings. On February 10, 2020, Dermot Mulroney was cast in a recurring role. On December 7, 2020, Christian Borle and Michael Potts joined the cast in recurring capacities for the second season. On January 6, 2021, Catherine Zeta-Jones joined the cast for the second half of the season.

Episodes

Series overview

Season 1 (2019–20)

Season 2 (2021)

Release
On May 13, 2019, Fox released the first official trailer for the series.

Internationally, the series aired on Global in Canada, on Sky One in the United Kingdom, on Fox One in Australia, and on Colors Infinity in India.

Reception

Critical response
The review aggregator website Rotten Tomatoes reported a 58% approval rating with an average rating of 6.19/10, based on 33 reviews. The website's critical consensus reads, "Though it shows promise, Prodigal Son sidelines a spectacular Michael Sheen in favor of a more pedestrian procedural storyline that often drifts too deeply into the grotesque." Metacritic, which uses a weighted average, assigned a score of 61 out of 100 based on 14 critics, indicating "generally favorable reviews".

Ratings

Season 1

Season 2

Home media
Warner Archive Collection released the complete first season as a manufacture-on-demand DVD and Blu-ray on September 8, 2020.

Notes

References

External links

2010s American crime drama television series
2010s American police procedural television series
2019 American television series debuts
2020s American crime drama television series
2020s American police procedural television series
2021 American television series endings
Crime thriller television series
Fictional portrayals of the New York City Police Department
Fox Broadcasting Company original programming
Television series about fictional serial killers
Television series by Fox Entertainment
Television series by Warner Bros. Television Studios
Television shows set in New York City